Tung Sam Kei is a village of in the Sai Kung North area of Tai Po District, Hong Kong.

Administration
Tung Sam Kei is a recognized village under the New Territories Small House Policy.

References

External links

 Delineation of area of existing village Tung Sam Kei (Sai Kung North) for election of resident representative (2019 to 2022)
 Antiquities Advisory Board. Historic Building Appraisal. Village House, No. 3 Tung Sam Kei Pictures

Villages in Tai Po District, Hong Kong
Sai Kung North